This is a list of players who have played for American football's New York Jets (1970–present) not including the New York Titans or any AFL players.

A

Donnie Abraham
John Abraham
Sid Abramowitz
Mike Adamle
Jamal Adams
Titus Adams
Margene Adkins
Louie Aguiar
Tui Alailefaleula
Dan Alexander
David Alexander
Raul Allegre
Lynwood Alford
Steve Alvers
Henry Anderson
Richie Anderson
Robby Anderson
Gary Arthur
B. J. Askew
Al Atkinson
Steve Atwater
Mike Augustyniak

B

Jim Bailey
Bill Bain
Chris Baker
Josh Baker
Ralph Baker
Tom Baldwin
Dave Ball
David Ball
Bradford Banta
Kurt Barber
Marion Barber, Jr.
Jerome Barkum
Kevan Barlow
Darian Barnes
David Barrett
Eric Barton
Carl Barzilauskas
Michael Bates
Ted Bates
Mike Battle
Brad Baxter
Fred Baxter
Tom Bayless
Sanjay Beach
Aaron Beasley
Anthony Becht
Le'Veon Bell
Josh Bellamy
Jacob Bender
Lou Benfatti
Barry Bennett
Woody Bennett
Kenneth Bernich
Atari Bigby
Verlon Biggs
Darnell Bing
Guy Bingham
DeCori Birmingham
Marquel Blackwell
Jeff Blake
Cary Blanchard
Derrick Blaylock
Jeff Bleamer
Adam Bob
Brooks Bollinger
Dorian Boose
John Booty
Étienne Boulay
David Bowens
Mark Boyer
Kyle Brady
Doug Brien
Mike Brim
Vincent Brisby
Bubby Brister
Willie Brister
Matt Brock
Clifford Brooks
A. B. Brown
Corwin Brown
James Brown
Kareem Brown
Mark Brown
Gordie Browne
Terrell Buckley
Todd Burger
John Burke
Chris Burkett
Shane Burton
Greg Buttle
Keith Byars
Dennis Byrd

C

Dave Cadigan
Glenn Cadrez
Khary Campbell
Jason Capizzi
Rob Carpenter
Jim Carroll
Dexter Carter
Gerald Carter
Jonathan Carter
Quincy Carter
Tyrone Carter
Tony Casillas
Rich Caster
Marko Cavka
Oliver Celestin
Pat Chaffey
Matt Chatham
Wayne Chrebet
Adrien Clarke
Kellen Clemens
Anthony Clement
Kyle Clifton
David Clowney
Reggie Cobb
Robin Cole
Drew Coleman
Erik Coleman
Fred Coleman
Kenyon Coleman
Keo Coleman
Marcus Coleman
Laveranues Coles
Manny Collins
T. J. Conley
Brett Conway
Curtis Conway
Emanuel Cook
Jim Carroll
Blake Costanzo
Jerricho Cotchery
Sam Cowart
Bryan Cox
Bob Crable
Jeff Criswell
Jamison Crowder
Buddy Crutchfield
Travis Curtis

D

Stanley Daniels
Paul Darby
James Darling
Sam Darnold
Bob Davis
Chris T. Davis
Steve Davis
Tyrone Davis
Andrew Davison
James Dearth
Eric Decker
Bill Demory
Glenn Dennison
Mike DeVito
Scott Dierking
John Dockery
Marty Domres
Hugh Douglas
Joel Dreessen
Chris Dressel
Demetrius DuBose
Roger Duffy
Mike Dukes
K. D. Dunn
Tim Dwight
Andre Dyson

E

Kevin Eakin
Quinn Early 
Tony Eason
John Ebersole
Lac Edwards
Abram Elam
Donnie Elder
Mike Elgin
John Elliott
Jumbo Elliott
Shaun Ellis
Quincy Enunwa
Phil Epps
Boomer Esiason
Donald Evans
Jim Evans
Josh Evans

F

Nuu Faaola
Jason Fabini
Chris Farasopoulos
James Farrior
Randy Fasani
Jeff Faulkner
Brett Favre
D'Brickashaw Ferguson
Jason Ferguson
Nick Ferguson
Jay Fiedler
Chafie Fields
Joe Fields
Dan Fike
Matt Finkes
Roger Finnie
Zarnell Fitch
Ryan Fitzpatrick
George Floyd
Marcus Floyd
Dave Foley
Glenn Foley
Paul Frase
Scott Frost

G

Derrick Gaffney
Clark Gaines
Harry Galbreath
Barry Gardner
Sam Garnes
Carl Garrett
Mark Gastineau
Tearrius George
Chas Gessner
Vernon Gholston
Mike Gisler
Aaron Glenn
Jason Glenn
Na'Shan Goddard
Chris Godfrey
Dan Goodspeed
Jonathan Goodwin
Alex Gordon
Flash Gordon
Dwayne Gordon
Toby Gowin
Scott Gragg
Ben Graham
Jeff Graham
Scottie Graham
Larry Grantham
Greg Gantt
Alex Green
Cornell Green
Eric Green
Victor Green
Shonn Greene
Bob Gresham

H

Christian Hackenberg
Mike Haight
Dennis Haley
John Hall
Bobby Hamilton
Harry Hamilton
Rick Hamilton
Brian Hansen
Billy Hardee
Steve Harkey
Bruce Harper
Reggie Harrell
David Harris
Jim Haslett
James Hasty
Matthew Hatchette
Johnny Hector
Jamie Henderson
Jerome Henderson
Karl Henke
Dave Herman
Neville Hewitt
Stephon Heyer
Cliff Hicks
Eric Hicks
W. K. Hicks
Winston Hill
Zach Hilton
Chuck Hinton
Victor Hobson
Alphonso Hodge
James Hodgins
George Hoey
Tony Hollings
Gus Hollomon
T. J. Hollowell
Rob Holmberg
Jerry Holmes
Santonio Holmes
Bobby Houston
Cedric Houston
Erik Howard
Jim Hudson
John Hudson
Bobby Humphery
Wayne Hunter

I
James Ihedigbo

J

Bobby Jackson
Charles Jackson
Frisman Jackson
Jazz Jackson
Joey Jackson
Kerry Jenkins
Kris Jenkins
Dave Jennings
Steve Joachim
Anthony Johnson
Johnny Johnson
Keyshawn Johnson
Leon Johnson
Pepper Johnson
Thomas Johnson
Trevor Johnson
Doug Jolley
Adrian Jones
Bobby Jones
J. J. Jones
Jimmie Jones
Johnny Lam Jones
Ken Jones
Marvin Jones
Scott Jones
Thomas Jones
LaMont Jordan

K

Jeremy Kapinos
Brad Kassell
Norm Katnik
Eric Kattus
Jermaine Kearse
Dustin Keller
Joe Kelly
Pete Kendall
John Kidd
Howard Kindig
Gordon King
Kliff Kingsbury
Joe Klecko
Rocky Klever
Joe Kowalewski
Mike Kracalik

L

Jeff Lageman
Pete Lammons
Skip Lane
Ty Law
Luke Lawton
Pat Leahy
Lance Legree
Jim Leonhard
Jeremy LeSueur
Mo Lewis
George Lilja
Toni Linhart
John Little
Kevin Lockett
Ernie Logan
Mark Lomas
Kevin Long
Ronnie Lott
Omare Lowe
Nick Lowery
Ray Lucas
Iiro Luoto
Rick Lyle
Lester Lyles
Johnnie Lynn
Marty Lyons
Jim Leonhard

M

Jerry Mackey
Kyle Mackey
Andre Maddox
Mark Malone
Nick Mangold
Ed Marinaro
Brandon Marshall
Keyonta Marshall
Leonard Marshall
Wilber Marshall
Curtis Martin
Jamar Martin
Jamie Martin
Steve Martin
Eddie Mason
Terance Mathis
Trevor Matich
Kevin Mawae
Don Maynard
Justin McCareins
Matt McChesney
Cliff McClain
Albert McClellan
Darrell McClover
Greg McElroy
Reggie McElroy
Ed McGlasson
Chester McGlockton
Jon McGraw
Kareem McKenzie
Steve McLendon
Pete McMahon
Erik McMillan
Freeman McNeil
Dave Meggett
Lance Mehl
Chuck Mercein
Mark Merrill
Mike Merriweather
Scott Mersereau
Rich Miano
Ray Mickens
Dave Middendorf
Brett Miller
Justin Miller
Cedric Minter
Rick Mirer
Johnny Mitchell
Mike Mitchell
Art Monk
Ty Montgomery
Will Montgomery
Brandon Moore
Derland Moore
DonTrell Moore
Rashad Moore
Rob Moore
Ronald Moore
Earthwind Moreland
Jake Moreland
John Mooring
Steve Morley
Chad Morton
C. J. Mosley
Santana Moss
Wayne Mulligan
Adrian Murrell
Marques Murrell

N

Browning Nagle
Joe Namath
Jim Nance
Lorenzo Neal
Richard Neal
Jared Newberry
Billy Newsome
Gerald Nichols
Doug Nienhuis
George Nock
Erik Norgard
David Norrie
Mike Nugent

O

Ken O'Brien
Don Odegard
Tom O'Connor
Neil O'Donnell
Matt O'Dwyer
Eric Ogbogu
Clint Oldenburg
Steve O'Neal
Dennis Onkotz
Burgess Owens

P

Babe Parilli
Calvin Pace
Tony Paige
Lonnie Palelei
Bernie Parmalee
James Parrish
Tupe Peko
Joe Pellegrini
Chad Pennington
Pete Perreault
Leonard Peters
Roman Phifer
Gerry Philbin
Lou Piccone
Bill Pickel
Lawrence Pillers
Anthony Pleasant
Jason Pociask
Brian Poole
Sione Pouha
Bilal Powell
Craig Powell
Marvin Powell
Garry Puetz

R

Bob Raba
Chuck Ramsey
Patrick Ramsey
Randy Rasmussen
Brett Ratliff
Darrol Ray
James Reed
Frank Reich
Darrelle Revis
Kerry Rhodes
Huey Richardson
Sheldon Richardson
Ryan Riddle
Dante Ridgeway
John Riggins
Phillip Riley
Darryl Roberts
William Robers
Dewayne Robertson
Damien Robinson
Matt Robinson
Bill Rogers
Ken Rose
Ben Rudolph
Coleman Rudolph
Pat Ryan
Sean Ryan

S

Troy Sadowski
Abdul Salaam
Mark Sanchez
Cairo Santos
George Sauer, Jr.
Anthony Schlegel
John Schmitt
Adam Schreiber
Ken Schroy
Bob Schweickert
Guss Scott
Todd Scott
Austin Seferian-Jenkins
Mickey Shuler
Randy Sidler
Matt Simms
Buster Skrine
Webster Slaughter
Brad Smith
Don Smith
Eric Smith
Geno Smith
Otis Smith
Wade Smith
Isaac Snell
Matt Snell
Kurt Sohn
Jerald Sowell
Blake Spence
Cody Spencer
Marc Spindler
Tony Stargell
Troy Stark
Jason Staurovsky
Daleroy Stewart
Dwight Stone
Omar Stoutmire
Derrick Strait
Donald Strickland
Dan Stryzinski
Terrence Stubbs
Chansi Stuckey
Jim Stuckey
Shafer Suggs
Bob Svihus
Kevin Swayne
Jim Sweeney
Jeff Sydner
Dave Szott

T

Jason Taylor
Trey Teague
Tim Tebow
Pat Terrell
Vinny Testaverde
Blair Thomas
Bryan Thomas
Eric Thomas
Marco Thomas
Randy Thomas
James Thornton
Richard Todd
LaDainian Tomlinson
Reggie Tongue
Al Toon
Jojo Townsell
Jack Trudeau
Jason Trusnik
Marques Tuiasosopo
Tom Tupa
Matt Turk
Maurice Turner
Robert Turner
Rocky Turner
Stacy Tutt
Jim Turner
Maurice Tyler

U
E. J. Underwood

V

Kaare Vedvik
Ray Ventrone
Michael Vick
Roger Vick
Jonathan Vilma
Kimo von Oelhoffen

W

Wesley Walker
Chris Ward
Dedric Ward
Derrick Ward
Danny Ware
Al Washington
Brian Washington
Leon Washington
Marvin Washington
Rashad Washington
Larry Webster
Dwayne White
Casey Wiegmann
Jermaine Wiggins
Daniel Wilcox
Muhammad Wilkerson
Brent Williams
David Williams
Harry Williams
Matt Willig
Ray Willis
Charles Wilson
Karl Wilson
Kyle Wilson
Brian Winters
Phil Wise
Richard Wood
Al Woodall
Tory Woodbury
Damien Woody
Larry Woods
Robert Woods
Roscoe Word
Kenyatta Wright
Wallace Wright
Mike Withycombe

Y

Bill Yearby
Craig Yeast
Lonnie Young
Ryan Young
Dave Yovanovits

Z
Mike Zordich

Footnotes and references

 
New York J
players